Lake Kiuruvesi is a medium-sized lake in the Vuoksi main catchment area. It is located in the Northern Savonia region in Finland. The lake is very shallow.

See also
List of lakes in Finland

References

Kiuruvesi